The Ascension Episcopal Church and Rectory (built (1874–76) are a historic church building and associated clergy house in Cove, Oregon, United States.

The church and rectory were listed on the National Register of Historic Places in 1974. As of 2014, the buildings form part of the Ascension School Camp and Conference Center, operated by the Episcopal Diocese of Eastern Oregon.

See also
National Register of Historic Places listings in Union County, Oregon

References

External links

Episcopal churches in Oregon
Churches on the National Register of Historic Places in Oregon
Houses on the National Register of Historic Places in Oregon
Carpenter Gothic church buildings in Oregon
Churches completed in 1874
Houses completed in 1874
Houses in Union County, Oregon
National Register of Historic Places in Union County, Oregon
1874 establishments in Oregon
19th-century Episcopal church buildings